Sir Gordon Stanley Downey  (26 April 1928 – 12 April 2022) was Britain's first Parliamentary Commissioner for Standards.

The Office of the Parliamentary Commissioner for Standards was set up by the House of Commons of the United Kingdom in 1995 as a result of recommendations made by the Committee on Standards in Public Life.  He resigned shortly after Trial by Conspiracy by J Boyd Hunt was published in 1998, casting doubt on his report about Neil Hamilton and the cash-for-questions affair.

Downey was previously chairman of the investors' "watchdog", the Personal Investment Authority.

Downey died on 12 April 2022, at the age of 93.

References 

1928 births
2022 deaths
Ombudsmen in the United Kingdom
Knights Commander of the Order of the Bath
Fellows of King's College London